Tyson Chandler (born October 2, 1982) is an American former professional basketball player and coach.

Chandler was drafted directly out of high school as the second overall pick of the 2001 NBA draft by the Los Angeles Clippers, then was immediately traded to the Chicago Bulls. He has also played for the New Orleans Hornets, Charlotte Bobcats, Dallas Mavericks, New York Knicks, Phoenix Suns and Los Angeles Lakers. As starting center for Dallas, he played an integral role in the franchise's first NBA championship in 2011.

Chandler was named to the NBA All-Defensive Team three times. While with New York, he was voted the NBA Defensive Player of the Year in 2012, when he was also named to the All-NBA Third Team. He won gold medals with the US national team in the 2010 FIBA World Championship and the 2012 Summer Olympics.

Early life and high school career
Chandler was born to Frank Chandler and Vernie Threadgill, though he did not meet his father Frank until later in his life. He grew up on a family farm in Hanford, California, just south of Fresno, California. Chandler began playing basketball at the age of three years on a basket Chandler's grandfather, Cleotis, fixed on a tree. Chandler grew up doing farm work such as milking cows, slopping pigs, and cultivating crops. At the age of nine years, Chandler and his mother moved to San Bernardino, California; he was already nearly six feet tall. As a child, Chandler was teased because of his height; children on his school basketball team joked that he was older than he really was, and that he had been left back several times in school.

As a freshman, Chandler enrolled at Dominguez High School in Compton, California, a school known for its athletics, producing basketball players such as Dennis Johnson and Cedric Ceballos. In his freshman year, Chandler made the varsity team and played with future NBA player Tayshaun Prince, who was then a senior. With the Dominguez Dons, Chandler became a teenage sensation; current players such as DeMar DeRozan watched him play and claimed "he was like Shaq". Point guard Brandon Jennings, who was a ball boy for Dominguez at the time, said, "You'd see the girls around Tyson, the Escalade he drove, and you wanted to be like him". Chandler earned accolades from Parade Magazine and USA Today and was selected to the McDonald's High School All-America Team. As a freshman, he was profiled on current affairs TV program 60 Minutes.

In his junior year, Chandler averaged 20 points, 12 rebounds, 6 assists and 3 blocks. In his senior year, Chandler led Dominguez to a state championship and a 31–4 record, averaging 26 points, 15 rebounds, and 8 blocks a game. Chandler was recruited by several universities and considered UCLA, Arizona, Syracuse, Memphis, Kentucky and Michigan. Chandler then declared for the 2001 NBA draft as a prep-to-pro.

Professional career

Chicago Bulls (2001–2006)
Chandler was selected by the Los Angeles Clippers with the second overall pick in the 2001 NBA draft, before being immediately traded to the Chicago Bulls for former No. 1 overall pick Elton Brand. The Bulls placed their rebuilding efforts on the backs of two teenagers in Chandler and Eddy Curry. Chandler's 2003–04 season saw him appear in a career-low 35 games. He missed two months early in the season with a bad back, before missing the final weeks of the season after landing hard on his back on March 27 against the Atlanta Hawks. In September 2005, Chandler signed a six-year deal with the Bulls. In July 2006, the Bulls looked to deal away Chandler, who had five years and $54 million left on his contract, in order to pursue Ben Wallace.

New Orleans Hornets (2006–2009)

On July 14, 2006, Chandler was traded to the New Orleans Hornets in exchange for P. J. Brown and J. R. Smith.

Chandler led the NBA in offensive rebounds in both 2006–07 and 2007–08, ranking second in the league in rebounds per game in 2006–07 and third in rebounds per game in 2007–08. He also ranked second in the NBA in field goal percentage in 2007–08 (.623) and would have led the league at .624 in 2006–07 but fell four field goals short of the statistical minimum to qualify.

On February 17, 2009, Chandler was traded to the Oklahoma City Thunder in exchange for Chris Wilcox, Joe Smith and the draft rights to DeVon Hardin. After examining Chandler's left big toe however, the Thunder determined that the risk of re-injury was too great and did not give Chandler a clean bill of health. As a result, on February 18, the trade was rescinded and Chandler was sent back to the Hornets. Chandler appeared in just 45 games during the 2008–09 season, missing 29 of the team's final 44 games due to left ankle injuries. Chandler finished the 2008–09 season as the franchise's all-time leader in field goal percentage (.611) and rebounds per game (11.3), while ranking fifth in total rebounds despite playing just 197 career games with the team (2,225).

Charlotte Bobcats (2009–2010)
On July 28, 2009, Chandler was traded to the Charlotte Bobcats in exchange for Emeka Okafor. In his lone season with the Bobcats, Chandler played in 51 games (starting 27) and averaged 6.5 points, 6.3 rebounds and 1.1 blocks despite being hampered by a stress reaction in his left foot that caused him to miss 29 games.

Dallas Mavericks (2010–2011)

On July 13, 2010, Chandler was traded, along with Alexis Ajinça, to the Dallas Mavericks in exchange for Erick Dampier, Eduardo Nájera, Matt Carroll and cash considerations. Chandler was the perfect fit during his first season with the Mavericks, anchoring their defense on a team with Dirk Nowitzki, Jason Terry and Jason Kidd. He was credited with giving the Mavericks the 'toughness' and defensive intensity that they sorely lacked, earning selection to the NBA All-Defensive Second Team for his efforts. He helped them reach the 2011 NBA Finals, where they faced the Miami Heat. In Game 4 against the Heat, with Nowitzki under the weather and ailing backup center Brendan Haywood unable to stay in the game, Chandler had 13 points and 16 rebounds in an 86–83 win that tied the series at 2–2. He grabbed nine offensive boards, with eight coming after the first quarter. The Mavericks went on to defeat the Heat in six games, with Chandler winning his first and only championship.

Following the 2010–11 season, Chandler was tipped to be a highly sought-after free agent. He was heavily courted by the Golden State Warriors and Houston Rockets among other teams. While they were keen to retain him, the Mavericks were cautious not to overextend on Chandler and risk missing out on Dwight Howard or Deron Williams in 2012. As a result, they offered only a two-year deal to Chandler, which he declined. Mavericks owner Mark Cuban infamously broke-up the championship-winning team, choosing to add Lamar Odom, Vince Carter and Delonte West instead of bringing back Chandler, J. J. Barea and DeShawn Stevenson. At the time, Cuban chose to proceed cautiously in the era of a new collective bargaining agreement, believing that financial flexibility (and not locking in veterans to long-term deals that would eat up future cap space) was more valuable than trying to repeat as champions. In August 2016, Chandler opined that if the Mavericks had not broken up the 2011 championship-winning team, they would have gone on to win back-to-back titles in 2012.

New York Knicks (2011–2014)

On December 10, 2011, Chandler was acquired by the New York Knicks via sign-and-trade as part of a three-team trade, joining the Knicks on a reported four-year, $58 million contract. With Chandler anchoring the middle, New York's defense improved markedly in 2011–12. After finishing 22nd in defensive efficiency in 2010–11, the Knicks finished fifth in defensive efficiency in 2011–12. Chandler finished the season with a league-leading 67.9 field-goal percentage, the third highest in league history at the time behind only Wilt Chamberlain with 72.7 in 1972–73 and 68.3 in 1966–67. In May 2012, he was named the NBA Defensive Player of the Year and earned NBA All-Defensive Second Team honors. He became the first player in franchise history to win Defensive Player of the Year, and joined Alvin Robertson (1986) and Dikembe Mutombo (1995) as defensive players of the year on the Second All-Defensive Team. Due to a different voting system for All-Defensive, Oklahoma City's Serge Ibaka was the forward on the first team, while Orlando's Dwight Howard was the center. Additionally, Chandler was named to the All-NBA Third Team.

In January 2013, Chandler was named an NBA All-Star for the first time in his 12-year career, earning selection as an Eastern Conference reserve for the 2013 NBA All-Star Game. In early February, he tied a franchise record with three straight 20-rebound games, becoming the first Knicks player to have 20 in three straight games since Willis Reed in December 1969. On February 27, he had 16 points and a career-best 28 rebounds in a 109–105 win over the Golden State Warriors. In May 2013, he was named in the NBA All-Defensive First Team, becoming the first Knicks player to earn first-team honors since Charles Oakley in 1994.

After the 2012-13 season, his third averaging a double-double while shooting at least 60 percent from the field, Chandler matched Wilt Chamberlain and joined Artis Gilmore as the only players in league history to accomplish this at least three times in their careers (DeAndre Jordan has since accomplished this feat).

Marred by injury early in the 2013–14 season, it took Chandler some time to get his rhythm back. A right knee injury suffered on November 5 against the Charlotte Bobcats and an upper respiratory illness endured in early January resulted in Chandler appearing in just 55 games.

Second stint with Dallas (2014–2015)
On June 25, 2014, Chandler was traded back to the Dallas Mavericks along with Raymond Felton in exchange for Shane Larkin, Wayne Ellington, José Calderón, Samuel Dalembert, and two second round picks in the 2014 NBA draft. The move reunited Chandler with championship comrades Dirk Nowitzki and J. J. Barea, as well as coach Rick Carlisle. In 75 games during the 2014–15 season, Chandler averaged a double-double with 10.3 points on 66.6 percent shooting and 11.5 rebounds, in addition to 1.2 blocks. With a career field goal percentage of 59.1 percent at the end of the 2014–15 season, Chandler had the second-highest field goal percentage in NBA history among those with at least 2,000 makes, trailing only Gilmore.

Phoenix Suns (2015–2018)
On July 9, 2015, Chandler signed a four-year, $52 million contract with the Phoenix Suns. On November 27, he suffered a strained right hamstring against the Golden State Warriors. He subsequently missed eight games. On January 21, Chandler grabbed a season-high 20 rebounds in a 117–89 loss to the San Antonio Spurs. Two days later, in a 98–95 win over the Atlanta Hawks, Chandler tied a Suns record with 27 rebounds, including 17 in the first half, and also had 13 points and a season-high five assists. His 27 rebounds equaled the record total set by Paul Silas in 1971, and his 13 offensive boards set a franchise record. Chandler also became the first Suns player in franchise history to record consecutive 20-rebound games.

On December 11, 2016, Chandler had 14 points and 21 rebounds in a 120–119 overtime loss to the New Orleans Pelicans. Two days later, he grabbed a season-best 23 rebounds in a 113–111 overtime win over the New York Knicks. With his third 20-rebound game of the season on January 3 in a 99–90 win over the Miami Heat, Chandler became the first Suns player with three-plus in a season since Charles Barkley (5) in 1993–94. On January 21, in a 107–105 win over the New York Knicks, Chandler set a team record by grabbing 15-plus rebounds in seven consecutive games. One night after setting the mark, Chandler ended his franchise record and career high of consecutive 15-plus rebound games at seven with nine rebounds against the Toronto Raptors. His best stretch of the season came between January 19–24, where he had three games of over 16 points (averaging 17.25) and over 16 rebounds (averaging 14.5), including scoring a season-high 22 points twice. Chandler appeared in 47 of the Suns' first 57 games before being deactivated following the All-Star break. Chandler reportedly told Suns management at the trade deadline he did not want to be dealt, and they acquiesced to his wishes.

During the 2017–18 season, Chandler battled through a neck injury that sidelined him periodically for 36 total games. On January 14, 2018, Chandler grabbed 14 rebounds against the Indiana Pacers to become the 40th player in league history to reach 10,000 for his career. He played in just 46 games in 2017–18, including missing the final month of the season.

After starting the 2018–19 season with a reduced role due to the arrival of rookie Deandre Ayton, Chandler and the Suns reached a buyout agreement on November 4, 2018.

Los Angeles Lakers (2018–2019)
On November 6, 2018, Chandler signed with the Los Angeles Lakers.

Houston Rockets (2019–2020)
On July 19, 2019, Chandler signed with the Houston Rockets. Chandler's final NBA game was played in Game 5 of the 2020 Western Conference First Round on August 29, 2020, against the Oklahoma City Thunder. In that game Tyson was in for less than 1 minute and only shot 2 free throws (missing both). The Rockets would win the game 114 - 80 and go on to win the series in 7 games.

National team career

Chandler was named first alternate on the United States national team which competed in the 2008 Beijing Olympics.

Chandler was a member of the United States team at the 2010 FIBA World Championship, a team that finished 9–0 in the tournament and won the gold medal, the USA's first world championship since 1994. He played in all nine World Championship games as a backup center, averaged 2.6 ppg and 2.7 rpg, shot 64.3 percent from the field, and blocked five shots.

Chandler was chosen to play for the United States team in the 2012 London Summer Olympics, and was named the team's starting center. The United States team finished undefeated in the tournament and won the gold medal over Spain with a 107–100 victory. Chandler played 9 minutes, and made 1 of 2 shots from the field. He ended the game with two points, which were the first points scored during the game.

Coaching career
In the summer of 2021, Chandler became a player development coach for the Dallas Mavericks.

Personal life
Until the age of 10, Chandler grew up with his grandfather on a farm in central California.

His sister, Erica, played basketball at Pepperdine University. He has three brothers: Terrell, Tervon, and Ryan. His paternal grandmother is of German descent. Chandler is the son of Frank Chandler and the late Vernie Re Threadgill.

Chandler and his wife Kimberly were married in 2005. They have three children. Chandler and his wife organized a charity to help New Orleans families who suffered from Hurricane Katrina. The charity helped purchase "small things" (as Chandler said) for the families' homes: TVs, stoves, microwaves, refrigerators, pots, pans etc. The wives of Chandler's teammates helped in the efforts.

He was the subject of a limited edition 100-copy zine titled "Tyson Chandler". The zine was created in fall 2011 by Camilla Venturini and the photographer Ari Marcopoulos, and was the subject of a lengthy article in the Wall Street Journal.

In 2016, Chandler joined UNICEF Kid Power as a UNICEF Kid Power Champion for a mission in Uganda, in an effort to fight global malnutrition and as well as raise awareness among kids, via the world's first "wearable for good".

Chandler and his wife Kimberly separated in August 2021. In September 2021, his wife filed for divorce, citing irreconcilable differences.

NBA career statistics

Regular season

|-
| style="text-align:left;"| 
| style="text-align:left;"| Chicago
| 71 || 31 || 19.6 || .497 || .000 || .604 || 4.8 || .8 || .4 || 1.3 || 6.1
|-
| style="text-align:left;"| 
| style="text-align:left;"| Chicago
| 75 || 68 || 24.4 || .531 || .000 || .608 || 6.9 || 1.0 || .5 || 1.4 || 9.2
|-
| style="text-align:left;"| 
| style="text-align:left;"| Chicago
| 35 || 8 || 22.3 || .424 || .000 || .669 || 7.7 || .7 || .5 || 1.2 || 6.1
|-
| style="text-align:left;"| 
| style="text-align:left;"| Chicago
| 80 || 10 || 27.4 || .494 || .000 || .673 || 9.7 || .8 || .9 || 1.8 || 8.0
|-
| style="text-align:left;"| 
| style="text-align:left;"| Chicago
| 79 || 50 || 26.8 || .565 || .000 || .503 || 9.0 || 1.0 || .5 || 1.3 || 5.3
|-
| style="text-align:left;"| 
| style="text-align:left;"| New Orleans
| 73 || 73 || 34.6 || .624 || .000 || .527 || 12.4 || .9 || .5 || 1.8 || 9.5
|-
| style="text-align:left;"| 
| style="text-align:left;"| New Orleans
| 79 || 79 || 35.2 || .623 || .000 || .593 || 11.7 || 1.0 || .6 || 1.1 || 11.8
|-
| style="text-align:left;"| 
| style="text-align:left;"| New Orleans
| 45 || 45 || 32.1 || .565 || .000 || .579 || 8.7 || .5 || .3 || 1.2 || 8.8
|-
| style="text-align:left;"| 
| style="text-align:left;"| Charlotte
| 51 || 27 || 22.8 || .574 || .000 || .732 || 6.3 || .3 || .3 || 1.1 || 6.5
|-
| style="text-align:left;background:#afe6ba;"|†
| style="text-align:left;"| Dallas
| 74 || 74 || 27.8 || .654 || .000 || .732 || 9.4 || .4 || .5 || 1.1 || 10.1
|-
| style="text-align:left;"| 
| style="text-align:left;"| New York
| 62 || 62 || 33.2 || style="background:#cfecec;"| .679* || .000 || .689 || 11.0 || .9 || .9 || 1.4 || 11.3
|-
| style="text-align:left;"| 
| style="text-align:left;"| New York
| 66 || 66 || 32.8 || .638 || .000 || .694 || 10.7 || .9 || .6 || 1.1 || 10.4
|-
| style="text-align:left;"| 
| style="text-align:left;"| New York
| 55 || 55 || 30.2 || .593 || .000 || .632 || 9.6 || 1.1 || .7 || 1.1 || 8.7
|-
| style="text-align:left;"| 
| style="text-align:left;"| Dallas
| 75 || 75 || 30.5 || .666 || .000 || .720 || 11.5 || 1.1 || .6 || 1.2 || 10.3
|-
| style="text-align:left;"| 
| style="text-align:left;"| Phoenix
| 66 || 60 || 24.5 || .583 || .000 || .620 || 8.7 || 1.0 || .5 || .7 || 7.2
|-
| style="text-align:left;"| 
| style="text-align:left;"| Phoenix
| 47 || 46 || 27.6 || .671 || .000 || .734 || 11.5 || .6 || .7 || .5 || 8.4
|-
| style="text-align:left;"| 
| style="text-align:left;"| Phoenix
| 46 || 46 || 25.0 || .647 || .000 || .617 || 9.1 || 1.2 || .3 || .6 || 6.5
|-
| style="text-align:left;"| 
| style="text-align:left;"| Phoenix
| 7 || 0 || 12.7 || .667 || .000 || .556 || 5.6 || .9 || .3 || .1 || 3.7
|-
| style="text-align:left;"| 
| style="text-align:left;"| L.A. Lakers
| 48 || 6 || 16.4 || .609 || .000 || .594 || 5.6 || .6 || .4 || .5 || 3.1
|-
| style="text-align:left;"| 
| style="text-align:left;"| Houston
| 26 || 5 || 8.4 || .778 || .000 || .462 || 2.5 || .2 || .2 || .3 || 1.3
|- class="sortbottom"
| style="text-align:center;" colspan="2"| Career
| 1,160 || 886 || 27.3 || .597 || .000 || .644 || 9.0 || .8 || .5 || 1.2 || 8.2
|- class="sortbottom"
| style="text-align:center;" colspan="2"| All-Star
| 1 || 0 || 17.0 || .400 || .000 || 1.000 || 8.0 || .0 || .0 || .0 || 7.0

Playoffs

|-
| style="text-align:left;"| 2005
| style="text-align:left;"| Chicago
| 6 || 0 || 28.7 || .475 || .000 || .696 || 9.7 || 1.3 || .2 || 2.2 || 11.7
|-
| style="text-align:left;"| 2006
| style="text-align:left;"| Chicago
| 6 || 0 || 17.3 || .667 || .000 || .300 || 4.5 || .5 || .3 || .3 || 1.8
|-
| style="text-align:left;"| 2008
| style="text-align:left;"| New Orleans
| 12 || 12 || 34.3 || .632 || .000 || .625 || 10.3 || .4 || .4 || 1.7 || 8.0
|-
| style="text-align:left;"| 2009
| style="text-align:left;"| New Orleans
| 4 || 4 || 23.5 || .500 || .000 || .500 || 5.3 || .5 || .5 || .3 || 3.8
|-
| style="text-align:left;"| 2010
| style="text-align:left;"| Charlotte
| 4 || 0 || 15.0 || .545 || .000 || .667 || 2.5 || .5 || .5 || .8 || 3.5
|-
| style="text-align:left;background:#afe6ba;"|2011†
| style="text-align:left;"| Dallas
| 21 || 21 || 32.4 || .582 || .000 || .679 || 9.2 ||  .4 ||  .6 || .9 || 8.0
|-
| style="text-align:left;"| 2012
| style="text-align:left;"| New York
| 5 || 5 || 33.4 || .440 || .000 || .600 || 9.0 || .8 || 1.4 || 1.4 || 6.2
|-
| style="text-align:left;"| 2013
| style="text-align:left;"| New York
| 12 || 12 || 29.2 || .538 || .000 || .750 || 7.3 || .3 || .7 || 1.2 || 5.7
|-
| style="text-align:left;"|2015
| style="text-align:left;"| Dallas
| 5 || 5 || 32.0 || .655 || .000 || .500 || 10.8 || .2 || .6 || 1.2 || 10.2
|-
| style="text-align:left;"|2020
| style="text-align:left;"| Houston
| 1 || 0 || 0.0 || .000 || .000 || .000 || 0.0 || 0.0 || 0.0 || 0.0 || 0.0
|- class="sortbottom"
| style="text-align:center;" colspan="2"| Career
| 76 || 59 || 28.9 || .566 || .000 || .628 || 8.1 || .5 || .6 || 1.1 || 6.9

Notes

See also
 List of National Basketball Association career blocks leaders
 List of National Basketball Association career rebounding leaders

References

External links

 

1982 births
Living people
2010 FIBA World Championship players
African-American basketball players
American men's basketball players
American people of German descent
Basketball players at the 2012 Summer Olympics
Basketball players from Los Angeles
Centers (basketball)
Charlotte Bobcats players
Chicago Bulls players
Dallas Mavericks players
FIBA World Championship-winning players
Houston Rockets players
Los Angeles Clippers draft picks
Los Angeles Lakers players
McDonald's High School All-Americans
Medalists at the 2012 Summer Olympics
National Basketball Association All-Stars
National Basketball Association high school draftees
New Orleans Hornets players
New York Knicks players
Olympic gold medalists for the United States in basketball
Parade High School All-Americans (boys' basketball)
Participants in American reality television series
People from Hanford, California
People from Kings County, California
Phoenix Suns players
United States men's national basketball team players
21st-century African-American sportspeople
20th-century African-American people